Alcadia is a genus of tropical and subtropical land snails with an operculum, terrestrial gastropod mollusks in the family Helicinidae.

Species 
Species within the genus Alcadia include:
 Alcadia affinis C.B. Adams, 1846
 Alcadia bermudezi Aguayo & Jaume, 1957
 Alcadia camagueyana Aguayo & Jaume, 1957
 Alcadia concinna (Gundlach in Pfeiffer, 1857)
 Alcadia dissimulans (Poey, 1858)
 Alcadia euglypta Clench & Aguayo, 1950
 Alcadia gonostoma (Gundlach in Poey, 1858)
 Alcadia hispida (Pfeiffer, 1839)
 Alcadia incrustata (Gundlach in Pfeiffer, 1859)
 Alcadia maxima Sowerby II, 1842
 Alcadia minima (d’Orbigny, 1842)
 Alcadia neebiana (Pfeiffer, 1862)
 Alcadia nitida (Pfeiffer, 1839)
 Alcadia nuda (Arango in Pfeiffer, 1866)
 Alcadia rotunda (d’Orbigny, 1842)
 Alcadia spectrabilis (Pfeiffer, 1858)
 Alcadia velutina (Poey, 1858)

subgenus Idesa H. Adams & A. Adams, 1856
 Alcadia conuloides (Guppy, 1868)

References 

Helicinidae
Taxa named by John Edward Gray